Arieh Worthalter (born 25 March 1985) is a Belgian stage and film actor. He studied at the Institut Supérieur des Arts (INSAS) in Brussels and began working in theatre. His film credits include Les Anarchistes (2015), Marie Curie: The Courage of Knowledge (2016), Eternity (2016), Bastille Day (2016), and Razzia (2017).

He received two Magritte Awards for Best Supporting Actor for his work in Girl (2017) and Mothers' Instinct (2018).

Selected filmography

References

External links

1985 births
Living people
Belgian male film actors
Male actors from Paris
Belgian male stage actors
Magritte Award winners
20th-century Belgian male actors
21st-century Belgian male actors